 
 is an editor and architecture critic.

After graduating in French literature from Waseda University, Ueda worked as an editor of architectural magazines, notably as chief editor of Toshi Jūtaku.

Books by Ueda 

Anjero Manjarotti: 1955–1964 / Anjero Manjarotti sekkei (: 1955–1964 / , Angelo Mangiarotti, 1955–64 / The designs of Angelo Mangiarotti). Tokyo: Seidōsha, 1965.
Japan hausu: Uchihanashi konkurīto jūtaku no genzai / Japan House  in Ferroconcrete. Tokyo: Graphic-sha, 1988. .
Mayonaka no ie: Ehon kūkan-ron (Houses late at night). Tokyo: Sumai-no-toshokan-shuppankyoku, 1989. .
Apātomento: Sekai no yume no shūgō jūtaku (The condominium: The world dream of collective housing). Tokyo: Heibonsha, 2003. .
Shūgō jūtaku monogatari (The story of collective housing). Tokyo: Misuzu, 2004. . A lavishly illustrated book about collective housing in Japan (primarily Tokyo and environs). It is well over three hundred pages long, with about fifty pages devoted to Dōjunkai buildings. The (color) photography for the book is by Hiroh Kikai, supplemented by older photographs. The content first appeared in Tokyojin from 1997 to 2001.

See also 
 Architecture criticism

Notes

External links 
 Shūgō jūtaku monogatari (publisher's page)

1935 births
Living people
Architecture critics
Japanese critics
Japanese writers
People from Tokyo
Japanese magazine editors
Waseda University alumni